Bozhou or Bo Prefecture was a zhou (prefecture) in imperial China, centering on modern Liaocheng, Shandong, China. It existed (intermittently) from 596 until 1267.

Geography
The administrative region of Bo Prefecture in the Tang dynasty is in Liaocheng modern western Shandong. It probably includes parts of modern: 
Liaocheng
Chiping County
Gaotang County

Population
In the early 1100s during the Song dynasty, there were 46,492 households and 91,333 people.

See also
Boping Commandery

References

 
 

Prefectures of Later Han (Five Dynasties)
Prefectures of the Tang dynasty
Prefectures of the Sui dynasty
Prefectures of Later Tang
Prefectures of Later Liang (Five Dynasties)
Prefectures of Later Jin (Five Dynasties)
Prefectures of the Song dynasty
Former prefectures in Shandong
Prefectures of Later Zhou
Prefectures of the Jin dynasty (1115–1234)